Vertigo is the third studio album by the new flamenco guitarist Jesse Cook. Musicians vary by track, including Jesse Cook, Stanley Dural Jr. (aka Buckwheat Zydeco), Art Avalos, Ofra Harnoy, Blake Manning, Carmen Romero, Miguel de la Bastide, Djivan Gasparyan, George Koller, Mario Melo, Etric Lyons, and Holly Cole. The final track, "Fragile", includes a second song.

Track listing
 "That's Right!" – 3:42
 "Byzantium Underground" – 3:59
 "Canción Triste" – 5:00
 "Rattle and Burn" – 3:46
 "Red" – 4:49
 "Breathing Below Surface" – 6:38
 "Avocado" – 3:02
 "Allegretto" – 3:22
 "Vertigo" – 4:10
 "Fragile" (Holly Cole) - 3:56/ – 11:03
(Contains the hidden track "Wednesday Night At Etric's")

All songs written by Jesse Cook, except "Fragile" written by Sting.

1998 albums
Jesse Cook albums
Narada Productions albums